Henry Watson Furniss (February 14, 1868 - December 20, 1955) was a doctor and diplomat from the United States.

He served as a consul in Bahia, Brazil and then as ambassador to Haiti.

He was born in Brooklyn, New York, the son of William Henry Furniss who was appointed Assistant Secretary of State in Mississippi. In Jackson, Mississippi his brother Sumner was born in 1874. The family relocated to Indianapolis about 1880.

U.S. President William McKinley appointed him as consul to Bahia, Brazil. In 1905 Theodore Roosevelt appointed him as ambassador to Haiti. The New York Times reported on his work in Haiti in 1909. In 1909 he wrote to Theodore Roosevelt. He was succeeded as ambassador to Haiti by Madison Roswell Smith.

After leaving Haiti with his family, he settled in West Hartford, Connecticut.

In October 1903, he married Anna Wichmann in London, England.

A 1908 photographic display included him and three other prominent African American officials in U.S. government posts. Various of his diplomatic papers and medical writings are extant.

His brother Sumner also became a doctor and was involved in Indianapolis politics.

References

External Links
 

1868 births
1955 deaths
Ambassadors of the United States to Haiti
People from Brooklyn
20th-century American diplomats